White Boy, White Boys or Whiteboys may refer to:

Film
 White Boy (film), a 2017 documentary about convicted teenage "drug lord" Richard Wershe Jr.
 The White Boys (film), a 1916 British silent drama film
 Whiteboyz, a 1999 film by Marc Levin

Music
 White Boy (album), an unreleased 1986 album from Dan Hartman
 White Boy (EP), a 2009 EP by Australian band Magic Dirt
 Whiteboys (soundtrack), the soundtrack to the 1999 film Whiteboyz
 "White Boy", a song by Jensen McRae from the 2021 EP Who Hurt You?
 "White Boy", a song by Bikini Kill from the 1993 album Yeah Yeah Yeah Yeah
 "White Boy", a song by Theory of a Deadman from the 2020 album Say Nothing
 "Whiteboy", a song by James from the 2008 album Hey Ma
 "Whiteboy", a song by Tom MacDonald (rapper) from the 2018 album Deathreats
 "White Boi", a song by Dillon Francis from the 2018 album Wut Wut
 "White Boys", a song from the musical Hair

Other uses
 Whiteboys, an 18th-century secret Irish agrarian organization
 The White Boys (mummers), a mummers' tradition in the Isle of Man

See also 
 White Man (disambiguation)